Steglitz is a locality of the Steglitz-Zehlendorf borough in Southwestern Berlin, the capital of Germany.  is a Slavic name for the European goldfinch, similar to the German .

Steglitz was also a borough from 1920 to 2000. It contained the localities Steglitz, Südende, Lichterfelde and Lankwitz. In 1960, Südende became a neighborhood within Steglitz.

History

While one Knight Henricus of Steglitz was already mentioned in an 1197 deed, the village of Steglitz was first mentioned in the 1375  of Emperor Charles IV, at this time also ruler of the Electorate of Brandenburg.

Steglitz witnessed the construction of the first paved Prussian country road, in 1792. The former village profited largely from its location on the Imperial Highway , today , which follows a trading route that dates back to the Middle Ages. The old  stretched from the far west of Germany through Aachen and Cologne to Berlin, then continued on eastward to end some two hundred miles northeast of Königsberg in East Prussia. The village of Steglitz was also boosted significantly with the construction of the  line of the Prussian state railways in 1838. This was the first railroad in Prussia and ran between Berlin and Potsdam. The Steglitz area was included in the southern line of Berlin's rail and transit systems from around 1850.

The southwestern surroundings of Berlin saw considerable change in the second half of the 19th century when luxurious residential areas were developed in the neighboring villages of Lichterfelde and later Dahlem. Lichterfelde West and East, founded by the entrepreneur Johann von Carstenn were developed as so called , settlements made up entirely of mansions or villas. In 1901 the first  youth group was founded in the basement of the Steglitz town hall.

Steglitz was incorporated into the city of Greater Berlin in 1920 together with neighboring villages. From 1920 to 2000, the administrative district IX was called  Steglitz. During the time of the Berlin Wall, Steglitz formed part of the American Sector of West Berlin.

Points of interest
 Gutshaus Steglitz (Steglitz Manor), a Neoclassical building designed by David Gilly in 1801, which since 1921 housed the small , one of the former Berlin state theaters, that nevertheless finally closed in 2006 
 The Schloßstraße, the second largest shopping area in West Berlin after Kurfürstendamm and Tauentzienstraße, including , one of Germany's first shopping malls opened in 1970
 Neo-Gothic Steglitz town hall, erected in 1898 
 Lutheran Matthew Church, built in 1880
 Catholic Rosary church from 1900, which received the title of a basilica in 1950
 The notorious , a 119 m (390 ft) highrise erected between 1968 and 1980, designed by architect Sigrid Kressmann-Zschach. Before the construction was finished, the developing company became insolvent in 1974, leaving a ruin in the middle of Steglitz until the works were resumed in 1977. To avoid further vacancy the borough's administration moved in, but had to leave the building in 2007 due to a contamination with asbestos. The building includes the Berlin U-Bahn station Rathaus Steglitz, a bus station, and a parking garage.
 The  ("Beer Brush"), a tavern in a tower on Schlossstraße with an interesting architectural style built in 1976
 , a large cinema erected in 1928 in the New Objectivity style. On 26 May 1945, it was the site of the first concert of the Berlin Philharmonic orchestra after World War II. On 6 June 1951, it saw the opening ceremony of the first Berlin International Film Festival
 The Fichtenberg hill, highest point in Steglitz, 68 m (223 ft).
 The  is an elementary and middle school near Südende.
  - Mirrored Wall - is a Holocaust Memorial with the names and addresses of 1700 Jews in the Steglitz area who were deported and murdered in Nazi concentration camps. Take either U-Bahn or S-Bahn to Rathaus-Steglitz. The Memorial is right across the street from the Station.

Transport
Steglitz is served by the Berlin S-Bahn line S1 at the stations Feuerbachstraße and Rathaus Steglitz as well as by the S25 at Südende. U-Bahn connection to the inner city is provided by the U9 line with the stations Walther-Schreiber-Platz, Schloßstraße and Rathaus Steglitz.

People
 Walter Fritzsche (1895-1956), football player
 Wolfgang Krause (1895-1970), philologist
 Kurt Aland (1915-1994), theologian and biblical scholar
 Maria Sebaldt (born 1930), actress
 Nils Seethaler (born 1981), Anthropologist

References

External links

Localities of Berlin

Former boroughs of Berlin